Kumdo is a modern Korean martial art derived from Japanese Kendo. Though romanized in a number of ways when written, Kǒmdo or Geomdo, the meaning remains "the way of the sword" and is cognate with the Japanese term. As a martial art, Kumdo has become accepted in Korean culture and society since its introduction from Japan to the degree that the term "kumdo" has, in recent history, become a generic label for other Korean martial arts based upon Korean Swordsmanship. Therefore, kumdo can apply to the sporting and competitive form of swordsmanship, similar to Kendo, or it can be applied to other martial forms of Korean swordsmanship such as Haidong Gumdo or Hankumdo. Although related to Japanese Kendo, minor differences exist in Korean Kumdo due to appropriation and acculturation. Such differences include, but are not limited to, the use of native terminology, the use of blue flags rather than red flags for the referees and minor modifications to the uniform.

History
In April, 1895 the Dai Nippon Butoku Kai (DNBK) was established in Kyoto, Japan for the preservation of older Martial activities such as sword, archery and unarmed combat. Swordsmen in Japan had established schools of kenjutsu (lit: "sword techniques") over centuries of military heritage and this material formed the basis for the DNBK swordwork.  

The introduction of bamboo practice swords and armor to sword training is attributed to Naganuma Shirōzaemon Kunisato, of the Jikishinkage-ryū during the Shotoku Era. 

(1711–1715). In 1896, the DNBK expanded to Korea as the Dai Nippon Butokukai - Choson-bu (Korean Branch) under Nakamura, Tokichi. Japanese Swordsmanship Kenjutsu, like Judo, was adapted to the Japanese educational system in 1911 at the prodding of Naito Takaharu and Isogai Hajime, both of the DNBK, since the use of a pliant bamboo sword and padded armour allowed competitors to strike each other with sword techniques in greater safety. The DNBK changed the name of this sporting form of swordsmanship, first called gekiken, (Kyūjitai: 擊劍; Shinjitai: 撃剣, "hitting sword") to Kendo in 1920. Korea, then subject to Japanese policy and administration, also adopted these practices but often using Korean rather than Japanese terminology. Made a required course in Korean schools in 1939, Kendo continued to be taught until 1945. After WWII, Kumdo and Kendo diverged to form separate but nearly identical practices. 
    
The following is a brief historical time-line of Kumdo development. 
    
 1895 In April, 1895 the Dai Nippon Butokukai, or “All Japan  Martial Virtue Society” had been established in Kyoto by civilian enthusiasts of various traditional Japanese arts such as Archery, Ju-jutsu and Ken-jutsu.
 1895 As many as 40 Japanese advisors are brought into Korea, several of which are placed with the national police administration. As part of the restructuring of the national Korean police indicated in the Kabo Reforms of 1894,  cadets at the Kyongmuchong or Police Academy are required to learn "kyok gom" (J. "gekki ken") or "combat swordsmanship" as one of its training subjects.
 1896 The Dai Nippon Butokukai (DNBK), Chosen-bu (Korean Branch) under Nakamura, Tokichi, is established.
 1904 Training in Japanese military sword (K. "kyok gom") is included in the curriculum of the Yonsong Army Academy.
 1906 Gekiken introduced into Korean school curriculum
 1908 a tournament held between the Korean police and their Japanese counterparts. Gekiken was also included in the first official national physical education program for the general public.
 1910 Japanese annexation/occupation of Korea.
 1919 According to Japanese records, the term Kendo is coined in Japan on August 1, 1919.
 1927 Kumdo becomes an official curricular subject in junior high schools.
 1935 Kumdo included in the 16th National Joseon Sports Festival
 1945 Korean liberation from Japanese occupation.
 1947 Korean kumdo begins restructuring and distancing from Japanese disciplines with the holding of the Seoul Police Kumdo Tournament
 1948 Approximately 100 highly ranked kumdo instructors gathered in Changdeokgung Palace and formed the predecessor to the Korean Kumdo Association
 1950 The 1st National Police Kumdo Tournament was held
 1952 A committee was created to oversee the formation of the KKA
 1953 The KKA was inaugurated and became affiliated with the Korean Amateur Sports Association
 The 1st National Individual Kumdo Championships were held (Same year that the All Japan Kendo Federation was formed)
 1956 Kumdo was once more included as an official event of the National Sports Festival after a break of 20 years
 1959 Kumdo became increasingly popular with the President's Cup Grade Category Tournament, and the National Student Championships
 1964 The Student Kumdo Federation became affiliated with the KKA
 1970 The Student Federation separated into the Collegiate Federation and the Secondary Schools Federation. The International Kendo Federation was formed and a Korean named as Vice President
 1972 Kumdo was included in the National Youth Sports Meet
 1979 The news agency Dong  Ilbo joined forces with the KKA in sponsoring the President's Cup National Championships
 1988 The Korean Social Kumdo Federation was formed and followed by the 1st National Social Championships
 1993 Inauguration of the SBS Royal National Championships

Today

Philosophy 
As with Martial Arts practices around the World, Korean Kumdo is imbued with cultural and philosophical thought of both current society and the historic past. In this way the sport aspects of Kumdo practice seek to build strong Character in its practitioners, while good Character in turn contributes to an ardent competitive spirit while respecting tenets of courtesy, respect, sportsmanship and fair-play. Though Kumdo is of modern vintage, Kumdo schools still invoke the "O-Gae" or "Five tenets" associated with the Silla kingdom of The Three Kingdoms Period. The modern rendition of this code is as follows.

"Be loyal and faithful to your country and organization.
Be faithful and respectful to your parents and elders.
Be faithful and respectful to your friends and colleagues.
Be confident and show courage when faced with injustice.
Be benevolent."

In the modern era, additional tenets have been added, often reflecting challenges common to competition. Known as "the Four Poisons of Kumdo" these include Surprise, Fear, Doubt (or Hesitation) and Confusion. Regular and ardent practice is encouraged to steadily bring these natural responses under control. Similarly, Kumdo practitioners seek to develop a state termed "emptiness (K. Pyoungsangsim) wherein natural execution of method is not impacted by circumstances or environment. Another condition, known as "Kiwi" --- the state of mental, physical and spiritual discipline--- seeks clarity and objectivity regarding the matter at hand. And Jan Sim (lit. "remaining mind") concerns steadfastness and perseverance.

Equipment

Protective equipment used in Kumdo is called Hogu()---bōgu in Japanese--- and consists of 6 elements.

NOT SHOWN.) Myŏn-soo-goon ("tenugui" in Japanese): cotton scarf worn under the helmet to absorb perspiration and prevent interference in the competitors' vision. It can also be called a "Dougong" but not to be mixed up with the Chinese definition.

A.) Homyeoun ("men" in Japanese): Helmet including a wire grill to protect the face.

B.) Kap ("dō" in Japanese): Chest protector

D.) Kapsang ("tare" in Japanese): Canvas and leather skirt worn around the waist to protect the hip and groin area

C,E.) Howan ("kote" in Japanese):(pair) formed mitts with cuffs used to protect the hand and wrist area.

As with any modern contact sport, the use of a mouthguard (K.'eep bohodae') is strongly encouraged.

In addition the individual will use a bamboo sword or Juk-To with which to strike or thrust at his opponent while fending off attacks.

1.) Pommel: Though identified as a part of the sword it is not accepted as a point of contact in regulation play.

2.) Ko-dûng-i: ("tsuba" in Japanese) w/ rubber retaining washer: the hilt or guard of the sword is intended to offer some protection to the hands, but is more commonly used as a point of contact in close-quarters contest.

3.) Kalnal: --- blade of the sword is only suggested as that side of the Juk-To opposite the Duengjul (lit. "back cord")and the two-thirds portion of the Juk-To forward of the guard.

4.) Duengjul: A yellow string that stretches form the guard to the tip of the sword and signifies the spine of the sword.

5.) Joonghyuk: is the leather band marking the proximal limit of the recognized striking area of the sword.

6.) Sunnhyuk: is the leather cap representing the tip of the sword. Use of thrusts in competition is infrequent but are recognized when contact is made solely with this part of the sword.

A.) Byounghyuk: Represents the handle of the sword

B.)

C.) Ta-dol-bu: The area between the sunnhyuk and the joonghyuk representing the first third of the sword blade. In competition, a strike is counted only when the point of contact is solely with this area of the sword.

A standard Juk-Do meant for adults measures 120 cm (47 Inches), with those meant for males weighing a minimum of  510 grams and those meant for females weighing at least 420 grams. Traditionally made of 4 bamboo strips and bound with leather, advances in technology have produced Juk-Do made of high-impact plastics and carbon fibers; however, only Juk-Do made of bamboo are allowed in competition. Proportionately smaller items are available for child competitors.

Lastly a Kumdo practitioner will use a Mok Geom (lit. wooden sword). Though used historically for competition, the potential for injury including the likelihood of death has caused this item to be relegated to highly structured individual and paired form-work as a substitute for using steel swords.

Clothing
Kumdo practitioners wear a Dobok (lit: "clothing for the way") or uniform which closely resembles that worn by Kendo practitioners, usually indigo-blue in color. Many Kumdo practitioners wear Paji ( 바지; lit. training  pants ) with billowy pants legs after the fashion of Japanese hakama without koshiita though the ankles are not secured after the fashion of the Korean Hanbok or traditional dress. A heavy cotton double-weave jacket (K.Otdori) is worn and traditionally closed with a tie (K. Maettiôp); though linen ties, after the fashion of Japanese traditions, are giving way to velcro fastenings. A belt (K.Dhee), usually signifying the individuals rank or standing completes the uniform. In national tournaments, the Korean national team typically wears white Keikogi with black trim and stripes on their hakama, in contrast to the all indigo-blue worn by Kendo practitioners.

By comparison, required dress at training in the classroom may be less formal and idiosyncratic to the values of a given school or teacher. In this way, the more common Martial Arts uniform of, white and/or black pants and jacket, bound with a belt is common. Most recently there has been a growing trend towards recognizing the Korean nature of this art by binding the uniform pants legs at the ankle after the fashion of the Korean Hanbok. Though formerly accomplished with laces, velcro fastening are now used.

Levels/Ranks
Kumdo practitioners begin at the lowest level - 10th geup - and advance in knowledge and skill to 1st geup. The requirements for advancement may differ depending on the school or organizational affiliation, but generally the goal of these levels is to imbue the practitioner with the fundamentals of conditioning, body motion, strategy and competition. After the geup levels, practitioners may continue to progress through a series of advanced ranks termed "master" or dan beginning with 1st dan level. As with geup levels, students may progress to higher Dan levels by passing required examinations and demonstrating their prowess in competition, both of which are closely observed and assessed by cadre of the school and its organization.

Training 
Though training varies from school to school and from organization to organization some general patterns are witnessed across all Kumdo groups. 
As a Korean practice all interactions between and among students and teachers is closely governed by Neo-Confucian sensitivity to respect and position. In this way students and teachers regularly bow to one another when entering and leaving the school, entering and leaving the workout area, before and after a notable event (IE competition; drill; instruction) and both at the beginning and ending of class. 
A typical class of about an hour to an hour and a half can be divided into quarters. The first quarter is a warm-up period which focuses on a brief period of stretching and some aerobic activities. The second quarter involves the use of a bamboo sword (K. Juk-To) for drills and striking targets. The third quarter involves donning protective armor and participating in sparring. Alternately, the third portion of the class may be used to practice standardized individual (K. Hyung) or paired (K. Bon) form work. Though not standard, almost all classes conclude with a cool-down activity. 
Forms practiced by kumdo practitioners include the Bonguk Geombeop, Joseon Saebeop and the ten bon or kendo no kata, forms standardized by the FIK. The first two forms, the Bonguk Geombeop and Joeson Saebop are unique in that they are practiced by Korean Kendoists and are not practiced by Japanese practitioners. Proficiency with these forms is required for rank promotion tests conducted by the Korea Kumdo Association, the de facto governing body for Korean Kumdo, and its overseas affiliates. The bon practiced in Kumdo may be of two types: a standard set of 10 Kata originating from Kendo and/or a set of 15 engagements originating in Korean swordsmanship (K. Geom Beop). Commonly, either set is performed without sonkyo bow, a unique Japanese gesture, and using Korean names and terminology in place of the original Japanese.  Joseon Saebeop and Bonguk Geombeop serve as Kumdo's practical historical link to Korean swordsmanship from previous eras, while bon and overall training and sparring style reflect Japanese influences on modern Kumdo. Recently, A few Kumdo dojang or schools also incorporate kuhapdo forms, the Korean variant for Japanese Iaido - an art focused on simultaneously drawing and cutting - in their curriculum.

Competition
Korea sends a team to the World Kendo Championships or WKC held every three years and have been strong competitors in the past WKCs. During the 13th World Kendo Championships held in Taipei, Taiwan from December 8–10, 2006, Korea defeated the United States to win the men's team championship for the first time, the first country other than Japan to win a title at the WKCs. The United States had earlier eliminated the Japanese team during the semi-finals.   
In competition, the main differences between kendo and kumdo are stylistic. Kumdo practitioners generally favor a dynamic style of play, focusing on using fast, aggressive, and effective small motion strikes to create openings for attacks more in line with battlefield use. Kendo practitioners however, general focus on the perfect single strike, waiting patiently for an opening and the correct timing to land a decisive attack. In recent years, with frequent contact between kendo and kumdo stylists through cross-training and competition, this distinction has somewhat blurred, as individual practitioners of either kendo and kumdo have preferred styles of play.

Engagements are conducted between two individuals at a time, each wearing body armor and using bamboo swords. The court is typically a square or rectangle 9 to 11 meters on a side - surrounded by an additional margin of 1.5 meters - and is presided over by a referee and two corner referees. During the engagement — a five-minute period with the possibility of a three-minute extension — competitors may accrue points by striking their opponent with a prescribed attack or thrust. Though infrequently studied in the classroom and sometimes seen in local competitions, the use of disarms followed by a throw or joint-lock is not allowed in international competition. Judgments regarding the nature or quality of an attack, as well as general comportment of the competitors, are signaled by the referees and require a majority agreement to make a determination. With minor stylistic differences (IE.Kumdo judges use blue and white flags instead of the red and white flags found in Kendo) these rules are followed by both Kumdo and Kendo organizations in both national and international play.

Organizations

The Dae Han Kum Sa Association (대한검사회), predecessor to the Dae Han Kumdohoe (The Korea Kumdo Association, 대한검도회) was organized on May 20, 1948. At that time, some 100 masters, including SUH Chong Hac, KIM Yong Dal, HO Ik Yong, CHUNG Tae Min, LEE Chung Ku, DO Ho Mun, KANG Nak-won, PAK Chong-kyu and KIM Yong-bae met on the grounds of the Changdok Palace and formed the Taehan Kumsa Association. In 1953, the Korean Kumdo Association was founded by Chong Hac SUH in cooperation with Kendo practitioners both in Korea and Japan. Later, Suh would relocate to Bettendorf, Iowa in the United States and establish the World Kumdo Association from that location.
Korea Kumdo Association (KKA) - the organization for kumdo in Korea due to its size and its influence through their heavy promotion of the art in the media.  The art promoted by them, Daehan Kumdo (大韓劍道), is virtually identical to kendo as practiced in Japan, with noted changes to reflect Korean cultural influences and methodology, and is the kumdo which Koreans normally refer to. The KKA has established overseas branches in other countries which have substantial Korean populations and have kumdo dojangs or schools.  Unlike most of the FIK affiliates, including Japan, they wish to see kumdo/kendo become an Olympic sport as with Judo and Taekwondo.
The World Kumdo Association (WKA) - Founded around 2001 as a merger of thirteen smaller, rival Kumdo organizations, they are critical of the KKA and seek to become a rival to the FIK by having Kumdo included in the Olympic games with them as the recognized governing body ahead of the FIK. Equipment, Forms, regulations and scoring are essentially the same, though Korean practice tends to be somewhat more heavy-handed, while Japanese practice tends to be somewhat lighter. As a result, the WKA are proponents of changes to the format and scoring system, advocating the use of electric scoring as with fencing.
    
There are also a number of Kumdo dojang, or "training halls" outside Korea, primarily where there are large Korean emigre populations as in North America and Europe. Many of these dojangs choose to be affiliated with overseas branches of Kumdo organizations like the KKA rather than the local FIK affiliate for that country. For example, many of the Kumdo dojangs in the United States choose to affiliate with an overseas branch of the KKA instead of seeking association with the All United States Kendo Federation (AUSKF), the FIK affiliate for the US. However, because the KKA is a FIK affiliate, rankings awarded by them, are honored and accepted by the other affiliates including the AUSKF. While Kumdo practitioners outside Korea will also compete in Kendo tournaments, many choose to compete only at tournaments sponsored by a Kumdo organization. One example is the annual Bong-Rim-Gi Kumdo tournament held each summer among Kumdo schools in the United States and sponsored by an overseas branch of the KKA.

Terminology
Kumdo uses Korean language terminology exclusively, though much of it is cognate with the original Kendo terms.  For instance, the criteria used to determine whether a point is scored is known as gigeomche (기검체; 氣劍體), instead of ki-ken-tai-iｃchi (気剣体一致).  This name derives from the same Chinese roots; "gi" (氣) for qi or spirit, "geom" (劍) for the sword, and "che" (體) for the body.  Below is a table comparing some other similar terms and their corresponding Chinese characters.  Note slight differences in the appearance of some characters are due to Japanese use of shinjitai characters.

See also
Korean swordsmanship

References

External links 
 Official website for the World Kumdo Association (WKA) (In English and Korean)

Kendo
Korean swordsmanship